Mansurabad (also Romanized as Manṣūrābād) is a village in Bushkan Rural District, Bushkan District, Dashtestan County, Bushehr Province, Iran. At the 2006 census, its population was 82, in 17 families.

References 

Populated places in Dashtestan County